Adam Pugh (born October 12, 1977) is an American politician who has served in the Oklahoma Senate from the 41st district since 2016.

References

1977 births
Living people
Republican Party Oklahoma state senators
21st-century American politicians